Betty Zane Hinton (born February 22, 1950) is a Canadian politician, previously  representing the constituency of Kamloops—Thompson—Cariboo in the federal parliament.

Born in Trail, British Columbia, Hinton has served as mayor of Logan Lake, British Columbia, and as an alderman and school trustee in Kamloops, British Columbia.

In the 2000 Canadian federal election, she was elected to the House of Commons of Canada as the Canadian Alliance candidate in the riding of Kamloops, Thompson and Highland Valleys. She was re-elected as the Conservative Party of Canada candidate in the riding of Kamloops—Thompson in the 2004 Canadian federal election. A businesswoman, she has served as the Assistant Deputy Chair of Committees of the Whole, as well as the Opposition Critic of Multiculturalism, the Status of Women, Public Health, and as Critic of Veterans Affairs. She was also the Vice-Chair of the Subcommittee on Veterans Affairs of the Standing Committee on National Defence and Veterans Affairs.

Re-elected in the 2006 Canadian federal election, she was appointed Parliamentary Secretary to the Minister of Veterans Affairs in the 39th Parliament.  Hinton assisted the introduction of the Veterans' Bill of Rights. Hinton did not seek re-election in 2008; fellow Conservative Cathy McLeod succeeded her.

Electoral history

References

External links
 

Members of the House of Commons of Canada from British Columbia
1950 births
Living people
Mayors of places in British Columbia
Canadian Alliance MPs
Conservative Party of Canada MPs
People from the Thompson-Nicola Regional District
Women mayors of places in British Columbia
Women members of the House of Commons of Canada
People from Trail, British Columbia
People from Vernon, British Columbia
21st-century Canadian politicians
21st-century Canadian women politicians